A public execution in Dębica was carried out in 1946 when three members of the Polish anti-communist National Armed Forces (NSZ) organization, Józef Grębosz, Józef Kozłowski, and Noster Franciszek, were publicly executed by the communist Polish authorities in the market square of Dębica in southeastern Poland.

Introduction
On August 23, 1944 German soldiers left the town of Dębica, and the Red Army units captured it. However, the frontline remained on the Wisłoka river for a few months, until the beginning of 1945. Wehrmacht artillery shelled Dębica, soldiers of the Armia Krajowa, cooperating with the Soviets, fought the enemy. After some time the Nazis were relentlessly pushed to the west and left their positions and the whole area of Dębica County was in Soviet hands.

However, Soviet advance was regarded by many as yet another occupation. Behavior of some Red Army units and the NKVD confirmed this notion - they persecuted Polish patriots, arrested and imprisoned them. Thousands of members of the Home Army were either shot or sent to Siberia. Under the circumstances, several members of the resistance movement decided to hide in the forests and to continue struggle for free Poland. After dissolution of the Home Army, new, anti-Communist organizations including, Freedom and Independence (Wolność i Niezawisłość - WiN) and National Armed Forces (Narodowe Siły Zbrojne - NSZ) were created with the purpose was to rid Poland of Soviet occupiers. In 1945, Jan Stefko (aka "Mściciel" - "The Avenger") created a branch of the NSZ affiliated with the WiN in the district around Rzeszów. Grębosz, Kozłowski, and Franciszek joined the group and took part in a number of attacks on Communists which led to their capture and eventual execution.

The condemned
Józef "Pszczółka" Grębosz was born June 3, 1921 in Tuszym and worked as a bricklayer. He was a member of the Polish Army until deserting in April 1945. In January 1946 he joined Stefko's group. Józef "Mruk" Kozłowski aka Rąbski was born on September 30, 1924 in Bitków (USSR) and was from a peasant family. On February 2, 1946 he deserted MO Korczyn and joined Stefko's group where he became a commander and deputy. Franciszek "Bukiet" Noster was born October 29, 1920 in Domaradz from a peasant farmer family. He was accused of being a part of an attack in June 1945 in a forest near Domaradz where seven Ukrainians were killed. He joined with Stefko in January 1946.

Anti-Communist activities
In the spring of 1946 Stefko's unit, with some 30 members, was staying in the area of Sędziszów Małopolski. There, an exchange of fire occurred between them and agents of the Communist secret services from the Ministry of Public Security (Urząd Bezpieczeństwa - UB). On February 9, under the command of Józef Kozłowski, Józef Grębosz, Franciszek Noster and three others attacked the MO station in Domaradz and captured deputy commander Marian Urycie. They brought Urycia to where Stefko was staying and Stefko sentenced Urycia to death - a sentence which was carried out by Jan Dąbrowskiego on Stefko's command. A few days later, on February 15, a group including Stefko detained two militiamen and two officers of the PUBP, Walentego Dzięgiela and Stanisław Kosydara. They disarmed the four men and according to later description by Józef Grębosz, Stefko told Grębosz to shoot Dzięgiela and Grębosz shot him in the head. Shortly thereafter, Kosydara tried to escape and when he was recaptured, Józef Kozłowski shot him, also in the head. At the funerals for Dzięgiela and Kosydara, UB authorities announced that the perpetrators should be executed.

After this incident, the group moved towards Mielec, where on February 18 in the village of Przecław a group including Kozłowski and Grębosz attacked Communist forces which were staying at a palace of the Rey (Rejów) family, which had been nationalized. The attackers faced no resistance, they took jewelry and some paintings from the home of Stanisław Sobkowicz and left.

Capture of the group
On February 20 on the way towards Jasło, the unit was caught in a trap set by soldiers of the Polish Army, militiamen and agents of UB in Grudna Górna. Four persons were killed, 16 captured and 10 managed to flee, together with Jan Stefko. Three of those captured, Grębosz, Kozłowski, and Franciszek, were sentenced to death by District Court judge  Norbert Ołyński and lay judges Stanisław Stefańczyk and Edmund Kaczmarek in Rzeszów on June 25, 1946 by the WSR. The trial was prosecuted by Marian Stokłosy.

On Wednesday, July 10, 1946, Dębica's main square was full of people, as this was the market day. Two gallows were set - one in the square, another in the vicinity of the St. Jadwiga church. The purpose of the execution was obvious - to intimidate the population of the town.

The execution
It is difficult to establish how many people witnessed the event. At some point a truck entered the square, carrying three young men, members of WiN. The hangman, whose name probably was Stanisław Swieca, haltered all of them and soon afterward the truck drove off, leaving the condemned in the air.

The square was surrounded by the Communist agents who checked everything, making sure the execution was carried out without any obstacles. However, some witnesses claim that the head of one of the condemned men got out of the halter, but this was quickly fixed. Deaths were announced by doctor Roman Lic and Marian Stoklosa from Rzeszów prosecutor's office. The three were buried secretly by UB officers at the cemetery in Dębica and their graves were marked by members of the WiN. Other members of the group were captured and executed shortly later, including Jan Gomółka on July 11, 1946 and Zygmunt Ząbk on August 1, 1946. Stefko was shot in Autumn of 1946, although there were later investigations into whether or not he was actually killed.

Photograph
Most probably, the whole incident would have been forgotten, had it not been for a photograph, taken by Józef Stec. The snapshot was taken from a window of a building, delivered to London and published in several newspapers in the West. Stec was quickly captured and imprisoned, and spent many years behind bars.

References

External links
 A unique photograph of the execution, taken by Jozef Stec and then delivered to London

1946 in Poland
Anti-communism in Poland
Dębica
Dębica